The Edmundson Park Historic District is a nationally recognized historic district located in Oskaloosa, Iowa, United States.  It was listed on the National Register of Historic Places in 2007.  At the time of its nomination it contained 52 resources, which included four contributing buildings, six contributing sites, 19 contributing structures, and three contributing objects.  There were also 13 non-contributing buildings, five non-contributing sites, and two non-contributing structures.

The  park is an example of a Depression Era public works project that was constructed between 1936 and 1938 by the Works Progress Administration (WPA).  James Depew Edmundson, an Iowa attorney who grew up in Oskaloosa, gave a $20,000 bequest to the city to establish a park.  City engineer Don Russell saw the New Deal program as an opportunity to add value to the project.  The park is the work of landscape architect Ray F. Wyrick.  Its structures were designed in the rustic style that was promoted by the National Park Service between 1916 and 1942 for parks supported by all levels of government.

References

Protected areas established in 1936
Works Progress Administration in Iowa
Rustic architecture in Iowa
Oskaloosa, Iowa
Protected areas of Mahaska County, Iowa
National Register of Historic Places in Mahaska County, Iowa
Parks on the National Register of Historic Places in Iowa
Historic districts on the National Register of Historic Places in Iowa
Historic districts in Mahaska County, Iowa